Diocalandra is a genus of weevils in the subfamily Dryophthorinae and the monotypic tribe Diocalandrini.  Species are distributed mostly in Africa, Asia and Australia and includes the lesser or four-spotted coconut weevil.

Species
The Global Biodiversity Information Facility lists:
 Diocalandra caelata Marshall, 1948
 Diocalandra crucigera Motschulsky & V.de, 1858
 Diocalandra frumenti Fabricius, 1801
 Diocalandra impressicollis E.Csiki, 1936
 Diocalandra kamiyai Morimoto, 1978
 Diocalandra nigromaculata Voss, 1955
 Diocalandra punctigera E.Csiki, 1936
 Diocalandra reticulata Heller & K.M., 1927
 Diocalandra rugosula Marshall, 1952
 Diocalandra sasa Morimoto, 1978
 Diocalandra sechellarum Kolbe & H.J., 1910
 Diocalandra stigmaticollis A.Hustache, 1924
 Diocalandra subfasciatus E.Csiki, 1936
 Diocalandra subsignata E.Csiki, 1936
 Diocalandra taitensis E.Csiki, 1936

References

External links

Curculionidae genera
Dryophthorinae
Insects of Asia
Insects of Australia